Aarupadai Veedu Medical College & Hospital (AVMC) is a constituent college of Vinayaka Missions University, Salem, Tamil Nadu.  It is located at Kirumampakkam in Puducherry, India.

General information
Aarupadai Veedu Medical College is a tertiary care teaching center in the ] region, U.T. of Puducherry.

Courses
AVMC offers a variety of courses. Undergraduate courses include MBBS, BSc (Nursing), BASLP (Bachelor of Audiology and Speech-Language Pathology) Postgraduate courses include MD, MS, and Diploma in many specialities. The Curriculum followed is as per the Medical Council of India (MCI) Norms. The college was affiliated earlier to the Pondicherry University and is now affiliated to the Vinayaka Missions University, Salem.
The medium of instruction is English. The academic program for students include didactic lectures, small group teaching, practical, project work, demonstration of procedures and bedside clinics inclusive of history taking, physical examination and complete workup of cases. Clinical rotations include postings in all the outpatient departments. Training in community health includes postings at rural centers. Conduct regular CME and CNE programme that help medical professionals to maintain competence and learn about new and developing areas of their field.

Besides the hospital and out reach services, AVMC&H also has an infrastructure in terms of library, laboratories and student amenities such as hostel, canteen, sports and recreation facilities.

See also
List of medical schools
Medical college (India)

References

External links
Vinayaka Missions University – official site
Medical Council of India – official site 
Pondicherry University – official site
AVMC – more information

Medical colleges in Puducherry